Crețești is a commune in Vaslui County, Western Moldavia, Romania. It is composed of four villages: Budești, Crețești, Crețeștii de Sus and Satu Nou.

References

External links 
 
 Chalicotherium and saber-toothed tigers discovered at Creţeşti

Communes in Vaslui County
Localities in Western Moldavia